Facundo Nahuel Pansardi (born February 16, 1989) is an Argentine footballer. He was born in San Martín (Buenos Aires), and currently plays for Cobreloa of the Primera B de Chile.

Teams
  Estudiantes de Buenos Aires 2008-2012
  Temperley 2012-2013
  Platense 2013-2014
  Nueva Chicago 2015
  Cobreloa 2015–present

References
 
 

1989 births
Living people
Argentine footballers
Argentine expatriate footballers
Estudiantes de Buenos Aires footballers
Club Atlético Temperley footballers
Club Atlético Platense footballers
Nueva Chicago footballers
Cobreloa footballers
Primera B de Chile players
Expatriate footballers in Chile
Association football midfielders
Footballers from Buenos Aires